Khorasani Arabic is a dialect of Arabic spoken in Iran.  It is a variety of Central Asian Arabic spoken in a few villages in the Iranian province of Khorasan. Khorasani Arabic is not taught in school and is not widely spoken by the Khorasani Arab community.

According to Kees Versteegh, there are between 5,000 and 10,000 Khorasani Arabic speakers. Khorasani Arabic may be related to Uzbeki Arabic. It is influenced by Persian.

References

Arabic language
Languages of Iran